Charles Knode is a costume designer. He studied at Wimbledon School of Art.

Biography
Knode designed the costumes for the 1972 epic BBC drama of Leo Tolstoy's "War and Peace" which starred amongst others, Anthony Hopkins as Pierre Bezukhov. Among his first jobs on leaving the BBC was on Monty Python's Life of Brian. He has appeared as an extra in many of the Monty Python films. He has won 2 BAFTA Awards. The first for the Ridley Scott film "Blade Runner" and the second for "Braveheart". His designs have also appeared in a number of music videos starring Kate Bush . In 1996, In addition to winning the BAFTA award he was nominated for an Oscar for his work on the acclaimed Mel Gibson epic Braveheart. He won an Emmy Award for Alice in Wonderland
in 1999. He has designed many costumes for the Hallmark Channel, Including "Snow White" starring Sigourney Weaver and "Dinotopia".

Sharon Krossa notes that Braveheart contains numerous historical errors, beginning with the wearing of belted plaid by Wallace and his men. In that period "no Scots ... wore belted plaids (let alone kilts of any kind)." Moreover, when Highlanders finally did begin wearing the belted plaid, it was not "in the rather bizarre style depicted in the film." She compares the inaccuracy to "a film about Colonial America showing the colonial men wearing 20th century business suits, but with the jackets worn back-to-front instead of the right way around." "The events aren't accurate, the dates aren't accurate, the characters aren't accurate, the names aren't accurate, the clothes aren't accurate—in short, just about nothing is accurate."  The belted plaid (feileadh mór léine) was not introduced until the 16th century.  Peter Traquair has referred to Wallace's "farcical representation as a wild and hairy highlander painted with woad (1,000 years too late) running amok in a tartan kilt (500 years too early)."

Filmography

References

External links

British costume designers
Living people
Alumni of Wimbledon College of Arts
Emmy Award winners
Best Costume Design BAFTA Award winners
Year of birth missing (living people)